Scumeck (Stefan) Sabottka (born 18 January 1962 in Oberhausen, North Rhine-Westphalia, Germany) is a German concert and tour organizer and founder of the online ticketing portal tickets.de.

Life 
Scumeck Sabottka is the eldest child (of three children) of the merchant Hans Georg Sabottka and his wife Adelheid (née Kuntze). At the age of 18, Sabottka moved to West Berlin and joined the punk scene there.

In his home town, he was already a guitarist for the Dortmund punk rock group 'Public Enemy'. He got to know the musicians FM Einheit from the Hamburg group Abwärts and in 1982 he worked as the band’s driver. Later he became tour manager of the group Einstürzende Neubauten, and he accompanied them internationally until 1984.

Also in 1982, he organized his first concert at the SO 36 Club in Berlin with the Australian noise electric group, ‘SPK’.

In August 1984, together with the head of the company ‘Rough Trade Booking’ Dietrich Eggert and the manager of the band Die Toten Hosen, Jochen Hülder, he founded the company ‘MCT, Music Consulting Team GmbH’, in Herne. The company’s first tours were for the punk band Ramones from New York, the British punk combo King Kurt and the Welsh avantgarde musician John Cale. Parallel to this, Sabottka worked as an international tour manager for Violent Femmes and Johnathan Richman.

After the departure of Eggert and Hülder, Sabottka took over the company MCT in 1988 with the Düsseldorf concert organizers Bernhard Lewkowicz and Rene Heinersdorff jr.

In 1994 Sabottka moved to Munich with MCT, split from Lewkowicz and Heinersdorff Jr. and joined up with the famous concert organizers Marcel Avram and Fritz Rau, who took over the majority of the company shares. During this time (from 1994-1999) Sabottka organized concerts for artists such as: R.E.M, Lenny Kravitz, Red Hot Chili Peppers, The Cramps, Celine Dion, Tom Waits, Tanita Tikaram, Marilyn Manson, Melissa Etheridge, Sheryl Crow, Velvet Underground, Patti Smith, Ryuichi Sakamoto, Kraftwerk, Robbie Williams, Nick Cave and many more.

In 1998, Sabottka bought back all Avram & Rau's shares and moved to Berlin again. From 1991 to 2018, Sabottka was responsible for the worldwide coordination of the live performances of the electronic pioneers Kraftwerk. Since 1991 Sabottka has been responsible for the worldwide coordination of the live performances of the German rock band Rammstein. This was followed by stadium tours with Robbie Williams, which sold about 1.2 million tickets in 2006.

In 2005, Sabottka founded the internet concert ticket sales portal 'Tickets.de' (which he sold in 2010). For the first time in 2010, 150,000 personalized concert tickets were sold worldwide for the band Take That’s stadium tour. This was followed by the heated battle against the secondary sale of concert tickets at inflated prices.

In 2017, the documentary “Der Konzertdealer” by filmmaker Sobo Swobodnik about Scumeck Sabottka, which depicted the harsh, globalized business behind the tours in the backstage area of the concert industry, was released in German cinemas. The film music is by British experimentalist and artist Dinos Chapman.

References

External links
Official website MCT concert agency  
Movie “Der Konzertdealer” about Scumeck Sabottka: Announcement and trailer from 10/2017 
10 2017 – Movie reviews “Der Konzertdealer”, 10/2017 
Partisan Filmverleih, description and trailer of the documentary, 2017   
Scumeck Sabottka at Strrr TV, 60-minute, where he presents his favourite videos 
Spiegel Online article about Scumeck’s Aston Martin Lagonda, 03/2015   
Online Wirtschaftswoche article about ticketing. P. 4 also about Scumeck, 05/2014     
Article in SZ Magazin on personalised tickets, 12/2010

Interviews
Scumeck Sabottka on his biography, MCT Webseite, 2017  
WDR on Konzertdealer movie on WDR, 10/2017      
Taz – on Konzertdealer film, 12/2017 
Freunde von Freunden, 03/2015 
podcast Hörbar Rust / radioeins: Scumeck appearing as a guest with Bettina Rust part1 11/2015 
podcast Hörbar Rust / radioeins: Scumeck appearing as a guest with Bettina Rust part2, 11/2015

Living people
1962 births
Businesspeople from North Rhine-Westphalia
People from Oberhausen